Estifanos Seyoum (born 1947) is an Eritrean politician.

He joined the Eritrean People's Liberation Front in 1972. Since independence, he has held the following positions:
member of the Central Council of People's Front for Democracy and Justice
member of the National Assembly
Secretary of Finance
Head of Finance in the Eritrean Defence Forces 
Director-General of Inland Revenue
Brigadier General
He was educated at the University of Wisconsin–Madison, where he received a master's degree in finance and economics. As of 2005, he was in prison with the G-15.

Seyoum has fathered 5 children: Shewit, Ariam, Miriam, Kibrom, and Natnael.

References 

1947 births
Living people
Members of the National Assembly (Eritrea)
People's Front for Democracy and Justice politicians
University of Wisconsin–Madison alumni